Myringomycosis is a fungal infection of the tympanic membrane. It is caused by the presence of the fungus Aspergillus nigricans or flavescens.

References

Further reading 
 
 

Animal fungal diseases
Myringomycosis